Judge's Screen is a role-playing game supplement published by TSR in 1984 for the Marvel Super Heroes role-playing game.

Contents
Judge's Screen is a GM's screen for the Basic rules, with a map and guide to Manhattan as depicted by Marvel Comics. The referee's side as a representative selection of tables, including the 'universal' table which is used to resolve most actions. The player's side shows the same 'universal' table, and a map of the Marvel version of Manhattan. There is also an eight-page booklet to accompany the map, describing the city and giving rough details of major criminal power blocs and S.H.I.E.L.D.

The outside of the screen is enameled to provide protection, and features a map of Manhattan and the Universal Table in full color. On the inside of the screen is an assortment of tables for the Gamemaster's use, including another Universal Table. The other tables are random non-player characters, speeds, weapons and damage, rank numbers, and more. The 'Hero's Guide to New York' gives a short history of Manhattan, pointing out some of the scenic features of the various areas of the island, giving hints on some of the organizations in the Marvel universe.

Publication history
MHAC1 Judge's Screen was written by Jeff Grubb, with a cover by Al Milgrom, and was published by TSR, Inc., in 1984 as a cardstock screen with an 8-page pamphlet.

Reception
Craig Sheeley reviewed the Marvel Super Heroes Judge's Screen in The Space Gamer No. 71. He commented that "It seems that every game needs a GM's screen, and the one for the Marvel Super Heroes RPG is a pretty good one." He stated that "The 'Hero's Guide to New York' is almost more useful than the screen itself" and that it has "a very useful section on how to get around Manhattan if you don't fly, hop, swing, or teleport". Sheeley added: "The screen is typical, distinguished only by its outside protective covering. The real meat of this package is the Guide. It makes running a campaign in Marvel's New York possible, even if you've never been there." He continued: "The Marvel Super Heroes RPG has never had that many tables that require instant access during combat, and some of the tables on the screen were thrown in to take up space. Monetary resources are not likely to be important during combat, but the Resources table is there." Sheeley concluded his review by saying, "The Marvel Super Heroes Judge's Screen is a good deal, thanks to the Guide. The two will be of great value to a campaign."

Marcus L. Rowland reviewed Judge's Screen for White Dwarf #62, rating it 4/10 overall. He described it as "a fairly standard triple cardboard sheet". Rowland commented: "This pack doesn't add much to the game (the 'universal' table appears twice on the covers of the original rule books, for example), and will probably only appeal to completists."

Reviews
Game News #6 (Aug. 1985)

References

Gamemaster's screens
Marvel Comics role-playing game supplements
Role-playing game supplements introduced in 1984